Provinces are the first-level division within North Korea. There are 9 provinces in North Korea: 
Chagang, North Hamgyong, South Hamgyong, North Hwanghae, South Hwanghae, Kangwon, North Pyongan, South Pyongan, and Ryanggang.

History 

Although the details of local administration have changed dramatically over time, the basic outline of the current three-tiered system was implemented under the reign of Gojong in 1895. A similar system also remains in use in South Korea.

A province are the highest-ranked administrative divisions in North Korea. Provinces have equal status to the special cities.

List of provinces
The populations listed for each province are from the 2008 North Korea Census.  From this census, there are an additional 702,372 people living in military camps.

Claimed provinces

North Korea claims seven provinces on the territory controlled by South Korea. These provinces are based on the divisions of the Japanese era, but correspond somewhat to the present South Korean provinces and the special cities partitioned out of them, owing to the alterations in the provincial division effected by South Korea being more conservative relatively to those effected by the north.

See also
 Administrative divisions of North Korea
 Special cities of North Korea
 Provinces of South Korea

References

 
Provinces, Korea N